Jaroslav Šafránek (May 23 1890 Pilsen – Aug 22 1957 Prague) was a Czechoslovak physicist who, in the second half of the 1930s, designed a system for the transmission of visual images by low-line mechanical television, which made the production of an authentic spatial impression of the picture, transmitted on the screen, possible. His discovery was, unfortunately, largely ignored by the Czechoslovakian community.

Further reading
Czech Physicist Jaroslav Safranek and His Television

External links
Short Biography 
Extensive Biography 

Czechoslovak physicists
1890 births
1957 deaths